Karsha (Dargwa: Хъарша) is a rural locality (a selo) in Akushinsky Selsoviet, Akushinsky District, Republic of Dagestan, Russia. The population was 1,234 as of 2010. There are 23 streets.

Geography
Karsha is one kilometre south of Akusha (the district's administrative centre) by road. Akusha is the nearest rural locality.

References 

Rural localities in Akushinsky District